N48 may refer to:

Vessels 
 , a minesweeper of the Royal Norwegian Navy
 , a minesweeper of the Royal Navy
 , a T-class submarine of the Royal Navy sunk in 1942
 , a U-class submarine of the Royal Navy scuttled in 1940

Other uses 
 N48 (Long Island bus)
 N48 motorway (Netherlands)
 Nagdlunguaq-48, a football and handball club in Greenland